Mohamed Al-Kafraini (born 1 September 1975) is a Jordanian middle-distance runner. He competed in the men's 800 metres at the 2000 Summer Olympics.

References

1975 births
Living people
Athletes (track and field) at the 2000 Summer Olympics
Jordanian male middle-distance runners
Olympic athletes of Jordan
Place of birth missing (living people)
21st-century Jordanian people